The 2006 season was São Paulo's 77th season in the club's existence. São Paulo finished in the second position in the Campeonato Paulista, only one point behind the winners Santos. A year after winning the Copa Libertadores, São Paulo once again challenged for the cup, being defeated by Internacional in a second final between Brazilian teams in a row, having beaten Atlético Paranaense in the previous edition. São Paulo lost by 2–1 in the Morumbi and drew in 2–2 on away second leg, thus coming in second place. As the current champions of Copa Libertadores, São Paulo played the Recopa Sudamericana versus Boca Juniors and was defeated by 4–3 on aggregate. Tricolor won the Campeonato Brasileiro fifteen years after their last title, in 1991 and became national champions for the fourth time, securing the title in 36th matchweek against Atlético Paranaense in the Morumbi with a 1–1 draw.

Squad

Final squad

Scorers

Overall

{|class="wikitable"
|-
|Games played || 73 (19 Campeonato Paulista, 14 Copa Libertadores, 38 Campeonato Brasileiro, 2 Recopa Sudamericana)
|-
|Games won || 43 (13 Campeonato Paulista, 8 Copa Libertadores, 22 Campeonato Brasileiro, 0 Recopa Sudamericana)
|-
|Games drawn || 18 (3 Campeonato Paulista, 2 Copa Libertadores, 12 Campeonato Brasileiro, 1 Recopa Sudamericana)
|-
|Games lost || 12 (3 Campeonato Paulista, 4 Copa Libertadores, 4 Campeonato Brasileiro, 1 Recopa Sudamericana)
|-
|Goals scored || 138
|-
|Goals conceded || 70
|-
|Goal difference || +57
|-
|Best result || 5–0 (A) v Portuguesa Santista – Campeonato Paulista – 2006.2.125–0 (H) v Juventude – Campeonato Brasileiro – 2006.10.14
|-
|Worst result || 0–4 (H) v Santos – Campeonato Brasileiro – 2006.7.30
|-
|Top scorer || Rogério Ceni (16 goals)
|-

Official competitions

Campeonato Paulista

Record

Copa Libertadores

Record

Campeonato Brasileiro

Record

Recopa Sudamericana

Record

See also
São Paulo Futebol Clube

References

External links
official website 

Brazilian football clubs 2006 season
2006